The University of Malawi College of Medicine (UMCM), also Malawi College of Medicine in Blantyre, is a constituent college of the University of Malawi, the oldest and largest public university in the country. The college houses the Faculty of Medicine of the University, and is the only medical school in Malawi.

Location
The College's main campus is located along Mahatma Gandhi Avenue, in the city of Blantyre, Malawi's financial capital and largest city, adjacent to Queen Elizabeth Central Hospital, the University's teaching hospital. The geographical coordinates of the medical college's main campus are: 15°48'06.0"S, 35°00'56.0"E (Latitude:-15.801667; Longitude:35.015556).

The coordinates of the second campus are: 13°58'35.0"S, 33°46'53.0"E
(Latitude:-13.976389; Longitude:33.781389).

A third campus is planned in the town of Mangochi, along the southern shores of Lake Malawi, at the premises of Mangochi District Hospital.

Overview
The college was created by the University of Malawi in 1991. It is one of the four constituent colleges of the university, the other three being (a) Chancellor College in Zomba, (b) The Polytechnic, in Blantyre and (c) Kamuzu College of Nursing, in Blantyre and Lilongwe. The anchor academic program is the five year Medical Bachelor and Bachelor of Surgery (MBBS) degree. Other undergraduate programs include Bachelor of Pharmacy and Bachelor of Medical Laboratory Technology.

Postgraduate degrees offered at the medical college include the two-year Master of Public Health, the four-year Master of Medicine in the clinical disciplines, and a Doctoral degree programme in collaboration with outside institutions.

Undergraduate courses
The following undergraduate courses are offered at UMCM. 
 Bachelor of Medicine and Bachelor of Surgery (MBBS)
 Bachelor of Pharmacy (BPharm)
 Bachelor of Science in Medical Laboratory Sciences (BMLS)
 Bachelor of Science in Physiotherapy
 Bachelor of Science in Dental Surgery (BDS)
 Bachelor of Science in Nutrition and Dietetics (BND)
 Bachelor of Science in Biomedical Sciences (BMS)

Graduate courses
The following postgraduate courses are offered at the UMCM.

 Master of Medicine (MMed) in Internal Medicine
 Master of Medicine (MMed) in Family Medicine
 Master of Medicine (MMed) in Obstetrics and Gynecology - 
 Master of Medicine (MMed) in Pediatrics
 Master of Medicine (MMed) in General Surgery
 Doctor of Philosophy (PhD)

See also
 Eric Borgstein
 Education in Malawi
 University of Malawi
 Mercy James Institute for Pediatric Surgery and Intensive Care

References

External links
 University of Malawi Homepage
 University of Malawi College of Medicine Homepage

University of Malawi
Medical schools in Malawi
Educational institutions established in 1991
1991 establishments in Malawi
Blantyre